André Reichling (1 February 1956 – 7 September 2020) was a Luxembourgish lieutenant colonel and the bandmaster of the Luxembourg Military Band between 1986 and 2011.

He composed the NATO Hymn in 1989, which formally became the official anthem for NATO in 2018. He died in 2020.

References

Luxembourgian composers
Luxembourgian soldiers
Luxembourg and NATO
1956 births
2020 deaths